Dissolve (Russian: Растворяться) is a 2019 feature-length drama film by the South Korean art-house director Kim Ki-Duk. It was shot in Kazakhstan with local actors and premiered at the Cannes Film Market under the temporary title 3000.

It was screened at the Almaty Film Festival in Kazakhstan on 19 September 2019, where it was compared to Kim's earlier film Samaritan Girl.

This was Kim's final film before his death the following year.

Plot 
In Almaty, a sheltered and chaste woman named Din sees her life intertwined with the experiences of a prostitute who looks like her.

Cast 
 Dinara Zhumagaliyeva as Din
 Sanjar Madi as Nurlan

References

External links
 

2019 films
South Korean drama films
Kazakhstani drama films
Films shot in Kazakhstan
Films about prostitution
2010s South Korean films